Blacko is a village in Požega-Slavonia County, Croatia. The village is administered as a part of the City of Pleternica.

According to national census of 2011, population of the village is 226. The village is connected by the D38 state road.

Sources 

Populated places in Požega-Slavonia County